In mathematics, the Laplace limit is the maximum value of the eccentricity for which a solution to Kepler's equation, in terms of a power series in the eccentricity, converges. It is approximately

 0.66274 34193 49181 58097 47420 97109 25290.

Kepler's equation M = E − ε sin E relates the mean anomaly M with the eccentric anomaly E for a body moving in an ellipse with eccentricity ε. This equation cannot be solved for E in terms of elementary functions, but the Lagrange reversion theorem gives the solution as a power series in ε:

or in general 

Laplace realized that this series converges for small values of the eccentricity, but diverges for any value of M other than a multiple of π if the eccentricity exceeds a certain value that does not depend on M. The Laplace limit is this value. It is the radius of convergence of the power series.

It is given by the solution to the transcendental equation
 
No closed-form expression or infinite series is known for the Laplace limit.

See also
Orbital eccentricity

References 

 .
 .

External links 
 
 

Orbits
Mathematical constants
Mathematical series